Nigel Ellis (born 8 August 1997) is a Jamaican sprinter. He represented his country in the 100 metres at the 2018 Commonwealth Games reaching the semifinals. He also won a bronze medal in the 200 metres at the 2016 World U20 Championships.

International competitions

1Did not start in the final

Personal bests
Outdoor
60 metres – 6.77 (-1.1 m/s, Kingston 2017)
100 metres – 10.04 (+2.0 m/s, Miami Fl 2021)
200 metres – 20.36 (-0.2 m/s, Kingston 2018)

References

1997 births
Living people
Jamaican male sprinters
People from Saint James Parish, Jamaica
Athletes (track and field) at the 2018 Commonwealth Games
Commonwealth Games medallists in athletics
Commonwealth Games bronze medallists for Jamaica
20th-century Jamaican people
21st-century Jamaican people
Medallists at the 2018 Commonwealth Games